Donal MacCarthy Reagh (1450/1460 – 1531) was the 12th Prince of Carbery from 1505 to his death in 1531. He belonged to the MacCarthy Reagh dynasty, and was the son of Finghin MacCarthy Reagh, 10th Prince of Carbery, and Lady Catherine FitzGerald, daughter Thomas FitzGerald, 7th Earl of Desmond.

In some sources and pedigrees he is known as Donal (Donnell) MacFineere MacCarthy Reagh, although it is not known if this refers to his father or to some other aspect of his upbringing.

Life 
Donal's troops, commanded by his son Cormac na Haoine, assisted his kinsman Cormac Oge Laidir MacCarthy, 10th Lord of Muskerry in the Battle of Mourne Abbey in 1521 against James FitzGerald, 10th Earl of Desmond. The MacCarthys were victorious.

He was also an enlightened patron of the arts and letters, like his father.

Marriages and issue 
Donal first married Lady Ellen MacCarthy Muskerry, daughter of Cormac Laidir MacCarthy, 9th Lord of Muskerry, and they had issue two sons and one daughter:

 Dermod, slain by Walter FitzGerald, son of the Earl of Kildare
 Donal, who died without issue
 Ellen, married Teige Mor O'Driscoll

He married secondly Lady Eleanor FitzGerald, daughter of Gerald FitzGerald, 8th Earl of Kildare, and they had issue four sons and three daughters:

 Cormac na Haoine MacCarthy Reagh, 13th Prince of Carbery
 Finghin, married Lady Catherine MacCarthy Mor, daughter of Donal an Drumin MacCarthy Mor, King of Desmond, but they left no issue
 Donogh MacCarthy Reagh, 15th Prince of Carbery, father of Florence MacCarthy and Dermot Maol MacCarthy
 Owen MacCarthy Reagh, 16th Prince of Carbery

 Catherine, married Teige MacCarthy, 6th Lord of Muskerry
 Shely, married Dermod An-Phudar O'Sullivan Beare
 Ellinor, married Connor-Fin O'Meagher

Notes

References 

 
  – Irish stem

 

Medieval Gaels from Ireland
MacCarthy dynasty
Irish lords
15th-century births
1531 deaths
16th-century Irish people
Year of birth missing